Donahoe's Magazine was a United-States-based Catholic-oriented general interest magazine that ran from about 1878 to July 1908, when it was absorbed by the Catholic World of New York. It had been founded by Patrick Donahoe, one-time editor of the New York Pilot. It has recently attracted attention as containing possibly the first literary mention of Mary MacLane, the American feminist memoirist, in the January 1896 number.

External links 
New York Times article on cessation
Google search showing free e-copies

Catholic magazines
Cultural history of Boston
Irish-American press